This list of bishops, seniors, and superintendents of Hamburg records the spiritual heads of the Lutheran church in Hamburg. Originally the Lutheran church in Hamburg formed a state church established by Johannes Bugenhagen's church order on 15 May 1529, after most of Hamburg's burghers had adopted Lutheranism before. At first the church order provided for superintendents as spiritual leaders. Since 1593 the spiritual leadership was wielded by a collegial body, the Spiritual Ministerium, with a senior elected by its members, the ministers (pastors) of the parishes. Separation of Church and State started in 1860, with the last privileges of state patronage waived in 1919.

After the putsch in the synod of 1933 by conservative Lutherans the new hierarchical office of bishop was created, establishing episcopalism and doing away with synodal and presbyterial polity and neglecting the traditional function of senior and spiritual ministerium. In 1934 through a second putsch by German Christians, backed by secular Nazi authorities, one of their acolytes assumed the episcopate. After the British occupiers prompted the bishop's resignation in late 1945, the presbyterial and synodal constitution of 1923 was restored, however, retaining the title bishop, but stripped of any episcopal supremacy, and reestablishing the office of senior, then functioning as the bishop's deputy. Conservative Lutherans prevailed again reelecting their first bishop of 1933. In 1977 the Hamburg Church seized its independent existence and merged with three neighbouring church bodies, in 2012 another merger with two more church bodies followed. Spiritual leaders for the Hamburg region retained the title of bishop, however, the traditional Hamburg seniorate was ended in 1976.

History

"In Hamburg as in other cities, the parishes … had been not only church districts but also municipal political districts since the Middle Ages. They … formed four incorporated bodies (Petri, Nikolai, Katharinen, Jacobi) in which the “allodial” (property-owning) burghers and the heads of guilds - thus only a fraction of the male population - were entitled to vote. The Reformation brought with it a significant curtailment of the senate's governmental power." "At about the same time, three deacons from each parish (twelve altogether), acting as “chief elders”, took on the task of centralizing, administering, and uniformly distributing relief to the poor." Later the parishioners of St. Michael's Church in the New Town, established as parish independent of St. Nicholas in 1647, were granted the same rights than the burghers in one of the four parishes in the Old Town, and the same number or representatives. Together with the four above-mentioned churches St. Michael's forms until today the quintet of Hamburg's head churches. "Beginning in 1685, there were thus fifteen chief elders: sixty deacons instead of forty-eight and 180 assembly members altogether, rather than 144. These structures existed into the nineteenth century, with each college recruiting new members from the next larger." Since Lutheran parishes and the collegial bodies staffed with their parishioners formed the constitutional bodies of Hamburg there was no easy way to open politics for non-Lutherans.

The superintendents were initially appointed by the senate. In 1593 the superintendency was given up and the pastors of the five urban congregations formed the spiritual ministerium (Geistliches Ministerium), collegially wielding spiritual leadership of the state church and electing from its midst one of the head pastors the senior as primus inter pares only.

In 1806 Hamburg turned into an independent sovereign city-state, annexed to France 1811-1814, and reconstituted thereafter. Reforms started with granting citizenship to non-Lutherans, and the full emancipation of Calvinists, Catholics and Jews until 1849. Adherents to these faithes could then enter officialdom and parliament. In 1860 the new Constitution of Hamburg provided for a start in separating state and church. Rather than the senate directly governing and administering Lutheran church matters, separate bodies were developed. The chief elders lost their role as constitutional body within Hamburg's administration, but continued as a body of Lutheran charity. The administration of the Lutheran state church was altered in order to become a body separate from the government. Only the Lutheran members within the senate formed a college in charge of confirming the acts passed by the synodals as well as the elections of various officeholders within the Church, such as the senior of Hamburg, pastors, synodals and even laymen in presbyteries. The Lutheran church established self-rule and in 1871 reconstituted as a regional Protestant church body called .

The spiritual leadership remained with the spiritual ministerium with its senior. In March 1919 the Lutheran senators waived the senate's supreme governance (like the royal supreme governance of the Church of England), the privilege to confirm elected seniors and taken synodal decisions. The Lutheran Church in the Hamburg State accounted for this change and adopted a democratised constitution in 1923. The synod was now the highest legislator of the church, electing the church council (Kirchenrat), the executive, including the senior as its ex officio member. The senior again was still to be elected from the five head pastors, but not by the members of the spiritual ministerium, but by the synod. The spiritual ministerium, comprising all the Lutheran clergy, with many more than the five head churches and parishes being established in the 19th century, was redefined as a mere advisory and reviewing body.

With the introduction of the general and equal suffrage also for women and people with no or only low incomes in Hamburg in 1919 also the Evangelical Lutheran Church in the Hamburgian State established equal suffrage in presbyterial and synodal elections by an emergency ordinance in 1919 and its revised constitution in 1923.

After Hindenburg's suspension of central Weimar Constitutional civil liberties, followed by the Nazi takeover on the Reich's level and with its Empowerment Act de facto doing away with state autonomy the last democratic senate was deposed, and the Hamburg parliament restaffed disregarding Hamburg's state election outcome but mirroring the rather Nazi-preferential allocation of seats realised on the Reich's level. This atmosphere of hunting democratic witches encouraged antirepublican Nazi-submissive synodals affiliated with the so-called German Christians and conservative antiliberal synodals of the so-called , led by Bernhard Heinrich Forck, to form a new majority in Hamburg's synod imposing a putsch within the church's bodies. The incumbent Senior Karl Horn was forced into resignation and an extraordinary synod convened. On 29 May 1933 this synod established the new function of a state bishop (Landesbischof) with hierarchic supremacy over all the clergy following the Nazi Führerprinzip, thus doing away with collegiality in church bodies, and empowered the new state bishop  to rule discretionarily without the synod, abolishing the previously practised synodal and presbyterial polity in Hamburg's church. This putsch turned Hamburg's church into a streamlined church body subjected to a state bishop obedient to the new Nazi regime and open for any experiment as to domesticating Protestantism for the Nazi purpose.

So when Hitler's government imposed an unconstitutional premature reelection of all presbyters (elders) and the synod for 23 July 1933 – also in the other regional Protestant church bodies in Germany – the so-called German Christians and the Kirchenpartei  (a merger including the Young-Reformatory Movement, dominated by the latter's proponents) presented the Lutheran Hamburg electorate united lists of candidates for the synod and all presbyteries, each staffed with 51% German Christians and 49% proponents of Gospel and Church. So in Hamburg the election of synod and presbyteries turned into a sheer farce. So these united lists attracted the traditionally fragmented rightist faction within the Lutheran electorate, but granted the so-called German Christians a share in the seats far exceeding their proportion among Lutheran parishioners. Nazi government-funded propaganda mobilised previously inactive church members adhering to Nazism to vote for the united lists, causing a very high turnout of voters unheard of in earlier church elections. So the candidates of the united lists gained the majority in the synod and in most presbyteries.

Opposition developed, called the Confessing Church, and its adherents considered the Evangelical Lutheran Church in the Hamburgian State to be a so-called destroyed church for having no unadulterated bodies and leadership anymore and thus not deserving the compliance of the opposing parishioners and clergy. The German Christians radicalised during the 1930s so that Schöffel, himself a putschist, was forced to resign again in early March 1934. On 5 March  succeeded.

With the defeat of Germany and its Nazi government the Evangelical Lutheran Church in the Hamburgian State returned to its pre-1933 constitution, only reluctantly cleansing its staff and bodies from few of the most extreme proponents of the German Christians. However, its spiritual leaders continued to be titled bishop. With effect of 1 January 1977 the Evangelical Lutheran Church in the Hamburgian State merged with three neighbouring Lutheran churches in the new North Elbian Evangelical Lutheran Church, which - consisting of three spiritual ambits – upheld the function of bishop of Hamburg until 2008. Since the episcopal ambits have been redrawn, with Hamburg being part of the new ambit called Hamburg and Lübeck including also parts of southeastern Holstein and Lübeck, but seated in Hamburg. This ambit structure continued also after the North Elbian Church merged with two neighbouring churches in the new Evangelical Lutheran Church in Northern Germany (abbr.: Northern Church)

Titles of the spiritual leaders of the Lutheran church in Hamburg
Titles and ambits of the incumbents altered. The respective incumbents of the spiritual leadership held the following titles and ambits :
 Superintendent of Hamburg in its respective political borders from 1532–1593
 Spiritual Ministerium, collegially with its senior as primus inter pares, for Hamburg in its respective political borders 1593–1933
 State Bishop (Landesbischof) of Hamburg in its political borders of 1936, from 1933 to 1976
 Bishop of the Hamburg Ambit, comprising the city-state in its political borders of 1937 and some congregations in its eastern vicinity, within the North Elbian Evangelical Lutheran Church from 1977 to 2008
 Bishop of the Hamburg and Lübeck Ambit, comprising the city-state and some congregations in its western and northern vicinity and all the congregations in southeastern Holstein including Lübeck, within the North Elbian Evangelical Lutheran Church from 2008 to 2012 
 Bishop of the Hamburg and Lübeck Ambit, as mentioned above, within the Evangelical Lutheran Church in Northern Germany since 27 May 2012

Spiritual leaders of the Lutheran church in Hamburg

Superintendents of Hamburg (1532–1593)

Seniors collegially with the Head Pastors (1593–1933)

State Bishops of Hamburg  (1933–1976)

Bishops of Hamburg (1977–2008)

Bishops of Hamburg and Lübeck (as of 2008)

Notes 

 List
Hamburg Bishop
Hamburg
Bishops
Bishops of Hamburg
Bishops

de:Evangelisch-Lutherische Kirche im Hamburgischen Staate#Superintendenten, Senioren und Landesbischöfe von Hamburg